Cloud species are a set of fourteen terms used to describe the shape and structure of clouds. Each one has its name abbreviated to a three letter term.

References

See also 
 List of cloud types

Cloud types

pl:Chmura#Klasyfikacja chmur